Pseudorabdion albonuchalis is a species of snake in the family Colubridae. It is endemic to Borneo and occurs in Sabah and Sarawak (Malaysia), Kalimantan (Indonesia), and Brunei. It is also known as the white-collared reed snake.

Description
Pseudorabdion albonuchalis has a small, slender body and a pointed head. It is oviparous.

Habitat and conservation
It is semi-fossorial and lives in leaf litter. It is potentially threatened by deforestation. However, it has a wide range and occurs in many protected areas, and is therefore not considered threatened overall.

References

Colubrids
Snakes of Southeast Asia
Endemic fauna of Borneo
Reptiles of Brunei
Reptiles of Indonesia
Reptiles of Malaysia
Taxa named by Albert Günther
Reptiles described in 1896
Reptiles of Borneo